Nathaniel James Speas, known as Nate James, (born 15 September 1979 in Lakenheath, Suffolk, England) is an English singer-songwriter. James released his debut soul album Set the Tone in 2005 which won him two MOBO Nominations for Best Newcomer and Best R&B Artist, featuring his revered first release "Set The Tone"
He released on his Frofunk imprint via Independent Labels around the world and became one of the most successful independent soul recording artists globally. James has sold over 1,000,000 albums and he has had airplay hits in both Europe and Japan. 

He won the Festivalbar in 2006, which was an Italian summertime singing contest that took place in the most important Italian city squares such as the Piazza del Duomo in Milan. In 2007, James won the Urban Music Awards' Best Album (Kingdom Falls) and Best Neo-Soul Artist. In February 2008, James and his band performed on the BBC show Later... with Jools Holland. Nate was a contestant on the BBC's prime time television show The Voice UK in April 2013.

Biography

Early life and music career
James has joint UK/US citizenship as he was born in 1979 on a U. S. Air Force base in England to an American father and English mother. As a recognised songwriter, he was signed by Universal Publishing in 2004, prior to him releasing any material as a performer. Unlike many young artists he did not sign away the copyright in his recordings in the fast pursuit of fame. He owns his own music videos and does his own A&R, James released on his own Frofunk imprint via various deals with Independent Labels around the world. In so doing James has become one of the most successful independent soul recording artists globally. James sold over 1,000,000 albums and enjoyed sizable airplay hits across mainland Europe and Japan. He made an appearance on The Voice UK on 27 April 2013 with 2 of the judges turning their chairs.

Set the Tone (2005–2007)
James released his debut album, Set The Tone in 2005 which is heavily influenced by soul artists such as Marvin Gaye, Prince and Stevie Wonder. It subsequently won James widespread critical acclaim and two MOBO nominations for Best Newcomer and Best R&B Artist. His album, written mostly by James, covers a range of music influences; from the bassy R&B of Set The Tone, the upbeat pop of Universal, the retro soul of The Message, the classic ballad sound of Justify Me to the rocky vibe in I'll Decline. There is also a duet with Dawn Robinson of En Vogue.

James has also worked with several noted co-writers that included David Brant (Mis-Teeq, Liberty X, Jamie Scott), Eg White (Adele's Chasing Pavements) on Universal, David Sneddon (Hurts, Lana Del Rey) and Jake Gosling (Ed Sheeran, Wiley (rapper)) on The Message, Andreas S. Jensen (Writer of Armand Van Heldens: MyMyMy), Peter-John Vettese (Annie Lennox: Walking On Broken Glass), Jamie Hartman (Will Young's All Time Love) on Justify Me and Emily Friendship (Sarah Connor's: You're the Kinda Man).

James has sold out numerous live shows at the Jazz Café in London and at other venues across the UK. His headline gig at Shepherd's Bush Empire had to be rescheduled due to the 7 July 2005 London bombings but went ahead in October 2005. Nate and his band also performed at Fruitstock 2005. He has had success in both Europe and Japan. He won the Festivalbar in Italy in 2006.
The Festivalbar is an Italian singing competition that takes place in the most important Italian squares during summer, such as the Piazza del Duomo, Milan.

Kingdom Falls (2007–2008)
The recording of James' second album Kingdom Falls was entirely self-funded out of the profits from his debut album. The album features a live orchestra on many tracks and more studio-based production than that featured on his first album Set The Tone. 
The album title track Kingdom Falls was influenced by James's experiences on a charity mission to Rwanda in 2006, where he witnessed a mix of joy and sadness, seeing the country and its many orphans recovering from the atrocities committed during the genocide of 1994. The album was mixed in Los Angeles by grammy winning Outkast collaborator Neal H Pogue and was released first in Japan and subsequently in the UK & Italy.
In 2007 James won Urban Music Awards Best Album (Kingdom Falls) and Best Neo-Soul Artist.

In February 2008 James and his band performed two tracks from the album on the BBC show Later... with Jools Holland – Choke and Back To You.

In Spring 2008, James embarked on his first tour of North America and played live shows in New York City, Toronto, San Diego, & Los Angeles. On 4 July 2008 James headlined the outdoor stage of the Montreal Jazz Fest, performing to an audience of over 120,000 in the Quebec city.

Revival (2009)
In between writing sessions for his next album, James recorded a selection of cover versions. These were released as Revival on 30 March 2009.  The album was produced solely by the producer of James's Set The Tone album David Brant.

SugaSmak! (2010)
In 2010 James formed the group SugaSmak! which consisted of Nate as the lead vocalist (now dubbed 'SugaJack') and Matt Gooderson of indie outfit Infadels ('Clyma'). Boasting a new ElectroSoul sound, the duo's debut single We Are was released through the small London independent "Better Get Records" on 22 November 2010.

"Back Foot" (2012)
In 2012 Nate teamed up with Manchester duo HeavyFeet to record the hit single "Back Foot". The track was released through Champion Records on 25 March 2012.

The Voice UK (2013)
In 2013 Nate James appeared on UK hit TV show The Voice UK. Performing "Crazy", James turned Jessie J and Danny O'Donoghue's chairs. He chose Jessie J as his coach, although he did consider being on Team will.i.am. He was eliminated during The Battle Rounds.

The Voice of Holland (2018)
In 2018, James appeared on the Netherlands hit TV show The Voice of Holland, where he performed "Issues" and turned all four chairs. He chose Waylon to be his coach.

Discography

Albums

EPs
2007: Funkdefining EP

Singles

As solo artist

With SugaSmack!
"We Are" (2010)

With Heavyfeet
"Back Foot" (2012)

Collaborations
2005: Poker Pets featuring Nate James - "Lovin' You" No. 43 (UK)
2005: Natalie Williams featuring Nate James - "Conversation"
2006: Sway feat. Nate James "Still on My Own"
2006: Pe'z v Nate James – "Live for the Groove EP" Top 40 (JAP sales chart)
2007: Paolo Meneguzzi & Nate James 'Music' / 'Musica' Top 30 (Italia Airplay)
2012: HeavyFeet & Nate James – "Back Foot"

Also features on
2004: Shapeshifters "Lola's Theme" No. 1 (UK single)
"Funkdefining" is featured in the Hollywood movies Run, Fat Boy, Run and How to Lose Friends & Alienate People

Accolades

2005: MOBO AWARD Best Newcomer nominee
2005: MOBO AWARD Best R&B Artist nominee
2005: CHANNEL U Best of British nominee
2005: SCREEN NATION AWARDS Best Video nominee
2006: MOBO AWARD Best UK Male nominee
2006: BT DIGITAL MUSIC AWARDS Best Urban Artist
2006: FESTIVALBAR Best International Artist winner
2007: URBAN MUSIC AWARDS Best Album (Kingdom Falls)
2007: URBAN MUSIC AWARDS Best Neo-Soul Artist winner

References

External links
Official website
Official Myspace
Nate James Interview By Pete Lewis, 'Blues & Soul' October 2009
Full-length video of Paradiso concert

1979 births
Living people
English people of African-American descent
21st-century Black British male singers
English soul singers
English male singer-songwriters
British contemporary R&B singers
The Voice UK contestants
People from Lakenheath